Darren Rosheuvel (born 15 May 1994) is a Dutch professional footballer who plays as a defensive midfielder for IJsselmeervogels. Rosheuvel is of Surinamese descent.

References

External links
 

1994 births
Living people
Association football midfielders
Dutch footballers
Dutch sportspeople of Surinamese descent
FC Utrecht players
SC Cambuur players
SC Telstar players
IJsselmeervogels players
Eredivisie players
Eerste Divisie players
Tweede Divisie players
Netherlands youth international footballers
Footballers from Amsterdam